This is a list of schools in Pembrokeshire in Wales.

English-medium primary schools

Angle Primary School
Bro Dewi Primary School
Broad Haven Primary School
Cleddau Reach Primary School
Coastlands Primary School
Cosheston Primary School
Croesgoch Primary School
Fenton Primary School
Golden Grove Primary School (Dual Stream - Welsh & English classes)
Goodwick Primary School (Transition school - Foundation Phase mainly through the medium of Welsh. At KS2 both languages used.)
Hakin Primary School
Haverfordwest Primary School
Holy Name RC Primary School
Hook Primary School
Hubberston Primary School
Johnston Primary School
Lamphey Primary School
Manorbier Primary School
Mary Immaculate RC Primary School
Meads Infants School
Milford Haven Junior School
Monkton Priory Primary School
Mount Airley Primary School
Nant-y-Cwm Steiner School
Narberth Primary School (Dual stream - Welsh & English classes)
Neyland Primary School
Orielton Primary School
Pembroke Dock Primary School
Pennar Primary School
Prendergast Primary School
Puncheston Primary School
Roch Primary School
Sageston Primary School
St Aiden's Primary School
St Dogmaels Primary School
St Florence Primary School
St Francis RC Primary School
St Mark's Primary School
St Mary's RC Primary School
St Oswald's Primary School
St Teilo's RC Primary School
Saundersfoot Primary School
Stepaside Primary School
Solva Primary School
Spittal Primary School
Stackpole Primary School
Tavernspite Primary School
Templeton Primary School
Tenby Primary School
Wolfcastle Primary School

Welsh medium primary schools 
Ysgol Casblaidd
Ysgol Bro Ingi
Ysgol Brynconin
Ysgol Cilgerran
Ysgol Clydau
Ysgol Eglwyswrw
Ysgol Ger Y Llan
Ysgol Glannau Gwaun
Ysgol Hafan y Mor
Ysgol Llanychllwydog
Ysgol Maenclochog
Ysgol Y Frenni

Secondary schools
Milford Haven School
Henry Tudor School
Haverfordwest High VC School, opened in 2018 with the merger of Tasker-Milward V.C. School and Sir Thomas Picton School
Ysgol Greenhill School
Ysgol Bro Gwaun
Ysgol Penrhyn Dewi, opened in 2018 with the merger of as Ysgol Dewi Sant, Ysgol Bro Dewi and Solva Community School

Welsh medium secondary schools  
Ysgol y Preseli
Ysgol Caer Elen - 3-16 school

Special schools
Portfield School

Independent schools
Nant-y-Cwm Steiner School
Redhill High School
Castle School Pembrokeshire

Further education colleges
Pembrokeshire College

References

 
Pembrokeshire